Maxine Daniels (2 November 1930 – 20 October 2003) was an English jazz singer who achieved notability in the post-war era.

Early life
Daniels was born Gladys Lynch in Stepney, London, an elder sister of singer and entertainer, Kenny Lynch. She was one of thirteen children.

Career
Her first recognition as a singer came from winning a local talent contest, at the age of 14, in a Stepney cinema. Local recognition lead to a first singing job with a semi-professional band led by a Canning Town grocer, until another talent competition organised by the Daily Sketch and sponsored by bandleader Ted Heath. A long residency (1954–56) with bandleader Denny Boyce followed at The Orchid Room in Purley. At Boyce's suggestion, she changed her stage name: through their regular Radio Luxembourg broadcasts, she gained a wider audience, and the opportunity to record for the Oriole label.

Personal life
She married Charlie Daniels in 1950, and had they had a daughter, Hazel Annette. Charlie died in 1988. In the late 1950s, Maxine shared a mutual attraction with actor Sean Connery, whom she met while performing at a theatre. Connery purportedly made a pass at her, but was informed she was already happily married with a daughter. Maxine Daniels died in Romford in 2003, aged 72. She was survived by her daughter and two grandsons.

Discography
 Coffee Bar Calypso (Oriole, 1957) 
 A Foggy Day (Oriole, 1957)
 I Never Realised (Oriole, 1958)
 Somebody Else Is Taking My Place (Oriole, 1958) with Denny Boyce & His Orchestra
 When It's Springtime in the Rockies (Oriole, 1958) with Denny Boyce & His Orchestra
 Passionate Summer (Oriole, 1958)
 Pete Corrigan and His Band of Hope (CBH, 1984) featuring Maxine Daniels
 The Magic of Maxine Daniels... Every Night About This Time (Calligraph, 1986)
 A Pocketful of Dreams (Calligraph, 1987)
 From the Heart (Calligraph, 1993)
 The Memory of Tonight (Calligraph, 1996)

References

External links
The Independent obituary, 24 October 2003
The Guardian obituary, 30 October 2003

1930 births
2003 deaths
English jazz singers
Singers from London
British women jazz singers
20th-century English singers
20th-century English women singers